The Bugti Stadium, formerly known as the Racecourse Ground, is a cricket ground in Quetta, Pakistan, owned by the Pakistan Cricket Board.

History

The first recorded match on the ground was on 29 October 1954. Until 1989, the Bugti Stadium was known as the Racecourse Ground. It was used as a venue for a One Day International match between Pakistan and Zimbabwe in October 1996. Between 1954 and 2008 the ground hosted twenty-two first-class matches. 

In September 2019, the Pakistan Cricket Board named it as one of the venues to host matches in the 2019–20 Quaid-e-Azam Trophy. Balochistan played four games at Bugti Stadium in 2019-20 – the first first-class games played in Balochistan since 2008.

See also
 List of cricket grounds in Pakistan

References

External links
Bugti Stadium at CricketArchive

Cricket grounds in Pakistan
1954 establishments in Pakistan